= Firestone Diversified Products =

American umbrella company for Firestone products

Firestone Diversified Products, LLC is an American umbrella company that houses Firestone Building Products, Firestone Specialty Products, Firestone Industrial Products Company, and Firestone Natural Rubber Company. The non–tire arm of Firestone Tire and Rubber Company, a subsidiary of Bridgestone, Firestone Diversified Products is headquartered in Indianapolis, Indiana and operates in 23 U.S. states as well as 10 countries worldwide. The company reports annual sales of $2.5 billion.
